A rest area is a public facility located next to a large thoroughfare such as a motorway, expressway, or highway, at which drivers and passengers can rest, eat, or refuel without exiting onto secondary roads.  Other names include motorway service area (UK), services (UK),  travel plaza, rest stop, oasis (US), service area, rest and service area (RSA), resto,  service plaza, lay-by, and service centre (Canada). Facilities may include park-like areas, fuel stations, public toilets, water fountains, restaurants, and dump and fill stations for caravans / motorhomes.

A rest area with limited to no public facilities is a lay-by, parking area,  scenic area, or scenic overlook.  Along some highways and roads are services known as wayside parks, roadside parks, or picnic areas.

Overview 
The standards and upkeep of service station facilities vary by jurisdiction.  Service stations have parking areas allotted for cars, trucks, articulated trucks, buses and caravans.

Most state-run rest areas tend to be located in remote and rural areas where there are practically no fast food nor full-service restaurants, fuel stations, hotels or other traveller services nearby. The locations of these remote rest areas are usually marked by signs on the freeway or motorway; for example, a sign may read, "Next Services 45 miles" "Next Rest Area 62 miles" or "Next Rest Stop 10 km".

Driving information is usually available at these locations, such as posted maps and other local information, along with public toilet. Some rest areas have visitor information kiosks or stations with staff on duty. There might also be drinking fountains, vending machines, pay telephones, a fuel station, a restaurant/food court, or a convenience store at a service area. Some rest areas provide free coffee for travellers which is paid for by donations from travellers and/or donations from local businesses, civic groups, and churches. Many service stations provide Wi-Fi access and have bookshops. Many rest areas have picnic areas. Service areas tend to have traveller information in the form of so-called "exit guides", which often contain very basic maps and advertisements for local motels and nearby tourist attractions.

Privatised commercial services may take a form of a truck stop complete with a filling station, arcade video games, and recreation center, shower and laundry facilities, and fast food restaurant(s), cafeteria, or food court all under one roof immediately adjacent to the motorway.  Some even offer business services, such as ATMs, fax machines, office cubicles, and Internet access.

Safety issues 
Some rest areas have the reputations of being unsafe with regard to crime, especially at night, since they are usually situated in remote or rural areas and inherently attract transient individuals.  California's current policy is to maintain existing public rest areas but no longer build new ones, due to the cost and difficulty of keeping them safe, although many California rest stops now feature highway patrol quarters.

Asia 

In Iran it is called Esterāhatgāh (Persian:استراحتگاه) meaning the rest area or rest place.

In Thailand and Vietnam, bus travel is common, and long-distance bus rides typically include stops at rest areas designed for bus passengers. These rest stops typically have a small restaurant as well as a small store for buying food. Some have proper restrooms and even souvenir shops.

Japan 
In Japan, there are two grades of rest areas on Japan's tolled expressways. These are part of the expressway system, allowing a person to stop without exiting the expressway, as exiting and reentering the tollway would lead to a higher overall toll for the trip. They are modeled and named after the "Motorway Services" offered in Britain.

The larger rest area is called a "Service Area", or an SA. SAs are usually very large facilities with parking for hundreds of cars and many buses - offering toilets, smoking areas, convenience stores, pet relief areas, restaurants, regional souvenir shops, a gas station, and sometimes even tourist attractions, such as a Ferris wheel or a view of a famous location. They are usually spaced about one hour apart on the system, and often a planned stop for tour buses. Two Service Areas also have a motel.  The other grade of rest stop is a "Parking Area", or a PA. PAs are much smaller, and spaced roughly 20 minutes apart on the system. Besides a small parking lot, toilets and drink vending machines are the only consistent amenities offered, while some larger parking areas have small shops, local goods, and occasionally a gas station - but are much smaller than their larger Service Area counterparts.

Since 1990s, many Japanese towns also established "Roadside stations" along highway and trunk route. In addition to conventional functions of service area, most of them also provide shops and restaurants dedicated to local culture and local produce, and a number of them would also feature information center, community hall, leisure facilities including hot springs and parks and such, and other features unique to individual stations. There are now over a thousand across Japan.

In the past, there were shukuba (stage stations) which serve as resting place for people travelling along traditional routes in Japan by horse or foot before modern transportation vehicles are introduced into Japan.

Malaysia 
In Malaysia, an overhead bridge restaurant (OBR), or overhead restaurant, is a special rest area with restaurants above the expressway. Unlike typical laybys and RSAs, which are only accessible in one-way direction only, an overhead restaurant is accessible from both directions of the expressway.

Philippines 
In the Philippines, barring certain exceptions, rest areas typically occupy large land areas with restaurants and retail space on top of gas stations. There are 10 service stations in the North Luzon Expressway, 9 service stations in the South Luzon Expressway, 3 service stations in both STAR Tollway and SCTEX, and a Caltex service station in Muntinlupa-Cavite Expressway.

North Korea

South Korea 
In South Korea, a rest area usually includes a park and sells regional specialties. Usually Korean rest areas are very big and clean. Cellphone charging is free and WiFi is available in every rest area.

Taiwan 
In Taiwan, rest areas are maintained by the Freeway Bureau and the Directorate General of Highways. There are 16 rest areas along four important freeways:  Freeways No.1 (Sun Yat-sen Freeway), 3 (Formosa Freeway),  5 (Chiang Wei-shui Memorial Freeway), 6 (Shuishalian Freeway) and one expressway (West Coast Expressway).

Europe 
Both the frequency and quality of European rest areas differ from country to country.  In some countries such as Spain rest areas are uncommon – motorists are directed to establishments that serve both the travelling public and the local population; in other countries access to a rest area is impossible, other than from a motorway.  The Dutch rest area De Lucht(nl)  is typical of many European rest areas, in that it has no access roads other than from the motorway itself.

Austria and Germany 

 (:de:Autobahnraststätte) is the name of the service areas on the German and Austrian Autobahn. It includes a fuel station, public phones, restaurants, restrooms, parking, and occasionally a hotel or a motel.

Finland 

Rest areas are constructed and maintained by the national government, but the local municipality provides local maps and sanitary services. If there are commercial services, the shop has the responsibility for cleanliness of the area. Rest areas are designed mostly for long-distance voyagers. The recommendation is that there should be a rest area each 20 km (12.4 mi).

France 

In France, both full service areas and picnic sites are provided on the autoroute network and regulations dictate that there is one such area every  on autoroutes. Both types may also be found on national (N-class) highways, although less frequently than on autoroutes. These types are not usually stated on approach signs, but are instead distinguished by the symbols used. A name is usually given, generally that of a nearby town or village, such as "".

Ireland 
Within Ireland, the term "rest area" is generally not used. Instead, it is referred to as motorway services, or simply "services". The majority of service areas within Ireland are operated by Circle K or Applegreen and contain petrol stations, truck stops, shops and fast food outlets such as McDonalds, Burger King, Subway or Chopstix. However, they differ from the United Kingdom in that only one service station contains a hotel - that being the M7 services in Portlaoise. There are 22 service stations within Ireland.

United Kingdom 

Like with Ireland, the term "rest area" is not generally used in the United Kingdom. The most common terms are motorway service areas (MSA), motorway service stations, or simply motorway services.  As with the rest of the world, these are places where drivers can leave a motorway to refuel, rest, or get refreshments. Most service stations accommodate fast food outlets, restaurants, small food outlets such as Marks and Spencer and coffee shops such as Costa Coffee; many service stations also incorporate motels such as Travelodge. Almost all the MSA sites in the UK are owned by the Department for Transport and let on 50-year leases to private operating companies. However, in December 2008, after a change in the law, the first official "rest area" in the UK was created at Todhills, on the newly opened section of the M6 between Carlisle and the Scottish border. Two other rest areas would be created in 2017 at Scotch Corner and Leeming Bar after the A1 in those areas were upgraded to motorway. All three of these rest areas are former A-road service areas which were too small to be signed as motorway services, hence the designations as rest areas.

Services can also be present on non-motorway roads, too. Most A-roads have services, albeit they are often less developed compared to motorway service areas, meaning that they might only have a petrol station and in some cases, a restaurant or café.

Lay-bys
The term lay-by is used in the United Kingdom and Ireland to describe a roadside parking or rest area for drivers. Equivalent terms in the United States are "turnout" or "pullout".

Lay-bys can vary in size from a simple parking bay alongside the carriageway sufficient for one or two cars only, to substantial areas that are separated from the carriageway by verges and can accommodate dozens of vehicles.

Lay-bys can be found on the side of most rural UK roads except motorways that are not on sections of smart motorways (but for emergencies only) where the hard shoulder is missing. They are marked by a rectangular blue sign bearing a white letter P, and there should also be advance warning of lay-bys to give drivers time to slow down safely. In practice, many local authorities neglect to maintain these signs to an adequate degree, and sometimes they are missing entirely.

Lay-bys are generally beneficial to road safety, as they provide drivers a safe place to stop, whether they wish simply to rest, check directions, make a phone call (as it is illegal to use a mobile phone whilst driving in the United Kingdom except in an emergency – Highway Code Rule 149), stretch their legs, or get refreshments, or if their car has broken down.

At some larger lay-bys mobile catering is provided by vendors operating from converted caravans, trailers, or coaches. These facilities generally offer much better value for money than roadside restaurants and therefore tend to be popular with truck drivers.

Some lay-bys have parking restrictions to prevent lorries and other vehicles from using them as overnight parking to sleep, or as a long-term storage area for trailers, and some have been permanently closed off by councils because of problems caused by their occupation by Irish Travellers or other itinerants.

North America

Canada 

In Canada, roadside services are known as service centres in most provinces. In some instances, where there are no retail facilities, they may be known as rest areas or text stops ('halte-texto' in French). Most service centres are concentrated along Ontario's 400-series highway and Quebec's Autoroute networks, while rest areas are found along the highway networks of all provinces, and the Trans-Canada Highway.

Nova Scotia has constructed a small number of full-fledged service centres along its 100-Series Highways.

In New Brunswick, the only rest areas are roadside parks with picnic tables and washrooms operated as a part of the provincial park system, but many have closed due to cutbacks. Occasionally, litter barrels are also found along the side of the road.

The Prairie provinces of (Saskatchewan, and Manitoba) have rest stops located along the Trans-Canada Highway (Highway 1). However, these stops are simply places to rest, or go to the washroom; they are not built to the standard rest area found on the 400-series highways in Ontario, or the Interstate Highways of the United States.

Alberta
Alberta Transportation operates seven provincial rest areas or safety rest areas. These include:

Highway 1 (Trans-Canada Highway) westbound between Brooks and Bassano;
Highway 1 (Trans-Canada Highway) eastbound between Tilley and Suffield;
Highway 2 (Queen Elizabeth II Highway) southbound between Crossfield and Airdrie;
Highway 2 (Queen Elizabeth II Highway) northbound near Highway 13 west of Wetaskiwin;
Highway 16 (Yellowhead Highway) eastbound and westbound between Edson and Carrot Creek;
Highway 43 accessible from both directions south of Valleyview; and
Highway 63 accessible both ways between Atmore and Breynat.

Alberta Transportation also designates partnership rest areas or highway service rest areas that are privately owned and operated highway user facilities. These facilities are currently located on Highway 1 at Dead Man's Flats, Highway 2 at Red Deer (Gasoline Alley), Highway 9 near Hanna, Highway 16 at Niton Junction and at Innisfree, and Highway 43 at Rochfort Bridge.

British Columbia
British Columbia has many services centres on its provincial roads, particularly along the Yellowhead Highway/Highway 16, the Coquihalla Highway/Highway 5, and on Highway 97C, the first service centres built in the province. One notable curiosity is a service centre built along Highway 118: it is a minor road connecting two towns to the Yellowhead Highway (Hwy. 16).

Ontario

Ontario has a modern and well-developed network of service centres, now mostly known as ONroute, located along Highway 401 along the Quebec City-Windsor Corridor, as well as sections of Highway 400. However, shorter and/or less trafficked 400-series highways (including the northern sections of Highway 400), do not have even basic rest areas along them at all.
  

The original service centres for Highway 401 were mostly built around 1962. In 1991, one was placed at the west end of the Greater Toronto Area, serving eastbound traffic in Mississauga; this location was branded as "Info Centre" and was intended as a welcome centre for Toronto. The Mississauga travel centre closed on September 30, 2006.

Most of the original 1960s-era service centres on highways 400 and 401 were demolished in 2010, with new buildings constructed on the original sites and operated by HMSHost subsidiary Host Kilmer under the ONroute banner.

The service centres in Ontario were originally of a generic, cafeteria-style nature. They contain gas stations, washrooms, picnic areas, and vending machines. During the late 1980s the service centres were taken over by Scott's Hospitality, a major publicly traded Canadian restaurant operator, who leased them out to major oil companies and fast food restaurant chains, with a single gasoline distributor and sole restaurant for most locations. In 2010-11, most of the older service centres were replaced by a common design operated by ONroute, which features a selection of fast food providers akin to a food court.

Reese's Corner at the intersection of Highway 21 and Highway 7 is often considered a service centre. Although Highway 7 was bypassed by the freeway Highway 402 in the late 1970s, Reese's Corner still receives much traffic as it is only a short distance from the interchange of Highway 402 and Highway 21 (Exit 25). Lastly, truck inspection stations (which are more frequent than service centres) can be used by travellers for bathroom breaks, although this is not encouraged.

Two off-highway service campuses at Exit 74 along the Queen Elizabeth Way in Grimsby are unofficial rest areas for travelling motorists. Two smaller such facilities also exist on the less-busy section Highway 400 north of the last official on-highway service centre.

Quebec
Washroom and picnic areas are located along the autoroutes and many of the provincial highways. Most of the rest areas have vending machines and/or canteens.

There are about 10 service areas (on Highways 10, 15, 20, 40, 55, 117, and 175); these areas have gas stations and restaurants.

United States 

In the United States, rest areas are typically non-commercial facilities that provide, at a minimum, parking and restrooms. In the United States, there are 1,840 rest areas along interstate routes. Some may have information kiosks, vending machines, and picnic areas, but little else, while some have "dump" facilities, where recreational vehicles may empty their sewage holding tanks. They are typically maintained and funded by the departments of transportation of the state governments. For example, rest areas in California are maintained by Caltrans. In 2008, state governments began to close some rest areas as a result of the late-2000s recession.

Some places, such as California, have laws that explicitly prohibit private retailers from occupying rest stops. A federal statute passed by Congress also prohibits states from allowing private businesses to occupy rest areas along interstate highways. The relevant clause of 23 U.S.C. § 111 states:
The State will not permit automotive service stations or other commercial establishments for serving motor vehicle users to be constructed or located on the rights-of-way of the Interstate System.

The original reason for this clause was to protect innumerable small towns whose survival depended upon providing roadside services such as gasoline, food, and lodging. Because of it, private truck stops and travel plazas have blossomed into a $171 billion industry in the United States.  The clause was immediately followed by an exception for facilities constructed prior to January 1, 1960, many of which continue to exist, as explained further below.

Therefore, the standard practice is that private businesses must buy up land near existing exits and build their own facilities to serve travelers.  Such facilities often have tall signs that can be seen from several miles away (so that travelers have adequate time to make a decision).  In turn, it is somewhat harder to visit such private facilities, because one has to first exit the freeway and navigate through several intersections to reach a desired business's parking lot, rather than exit directly into a rest area's parking lot.  Public rest areas are usually (but not always) positioned so as not to compete with private businesses.

Special blue signs indicating gas, food, lodging, camping and roadside attractions near an exit can be found on most freeways in the United States. Beginning in the mid 1970s, private businesses have been permitted to display their logos or trademarks on these signs by paying a transportation department (or a subcontractor to a transportation department) a small fee.  Until the release of the 2000 edition of the Manual on Uniform Traffic Control Devices, these signs were allowed only on the rural sections of highways.  The 2000 MUTCD added provisions for allowing these signs on highways in urban areas as long as adequate sign spacing can be maintained, however, some states (such as California and New York) continue to restrict these signs to rural areas only.  Currently, these signs are allowed on urban freeways in 15 states, with Arizona being the most recent state (as of 2013) to repeal the restriction of these signs to only rural highways.
 
Attempts to remove the federal ban on privatized rest areas have been generally unsuccessful, due to resistance from existing businesses that have already made enormous capital investments in their existing locations.

For example, in 2003, President George W. Bush's federal highway funding reauthorization bill contained a clause allowing states to start experimenting with privatized rest areas on Interstate highways.  The clause was fiercely resisted by the National Association of Truck Stop Owners (NATSO), which argued that allowing such rest areas would shift revenue to state governments (in the form of lease payments) that would have gone to local governments (in the form of property and sales taxes).  NATSO also argued that by destroying private commercial truck stops, the bill would result in an epidemic of drowsy truck drivers, since such stops currently provide about 90% of the parking spaces used by American truck drivers while in transit.

Service areas 

Prior to the creation of the Interstate Highway System, many states east of the Rocky Mountains had already started building and operating their own long-distance intercity toll roads (turnpikes). To help recover construction costs, most turnpike operators leased concession space at rest areas to private businesses. In addition, the use of this sort of service area allows drivers to stop for food and fuel without passing through additional tollbooths and thereby incurring a higher toll.

Pennsylvania, which opened the first such highway in 1940 with the mainline Pennsylvania Turnpike, was the model for many subsequent areas. Instead of operating the service areas themselves, the Pennsylvania Turnpike Commission opted to lease them out to Standard Oil of Pennsylvania (which was acquired shortly afterward by the modern-day Exxon), which in turn operated a gas station with a garage and Howard Johnson's franchises as a restaurant offering. The turnpike currently leases the gas station space to Sunoco (which operates 7-Eleven convenience stores instead of garages at the sites) and, as of 2021, the rest of the service area space to Applegreen.

In the summer of 2021, Iris Buyer LLC (an Applegreen company) announced that they were acquiring all travel plazas by HMSHost. The deal reached an agreement at the end of July 2021 officially transferring ownership. The New York State Thruway Service Areas (which will be owned by another company by Applegreen) was not affected by this transition due to the fact that Host's contract was expired. As of July 2022, the following states have service areas are operated or have stake by Applegreen (CT, DE, IN, ME, MA, NJ, NY, OH, PA, WV).

Some turnpikes, such as Florida's Turnpike, were never integrated into the Interstate system and never became subject to the federal ban on private businesses.  On turnpikes that did become Interstates, all privatized rest areas in operation prior to January 1, 1960, were allowed to continue operating.  Such facilities are often called service areas by the public and in road atlases, but each state varies:

 Connecticut, Florida, Maine, Massachusetts, Ohio, Pennsylvania, and West Virginia – service plaza
 Delaware, Kansas, Maryland, and Oklahoma – service area
 Illinois – oasis
 Indiana and New York – travel plaza
 New Jersey – service area or service plaza

Some states, such as Ohio, allow nonprofit organizations to run a concession trailer in a rest area.

Started in 2015(ish), The New Jersey Turnpike and Garden State Parkway Service Areas started advertising and selling products from Popcorn for The People. It is a non-profit organization which creates employment for people with disabilities, specifically Autism.

Text stops 
In 2013, the state of New York launched "It Can Wait", a program for encouraging drivers to pause at rest stops and parking areas along state roads to text (thereby avoiding texting while driving), by designating all such areas "text stops". The practice involves placing road signs which indicate the nearest "texting zone" at which to legally stop and use mobile devices such as smartphones.

Welcome centers 

A rest area often located near state or municipal borders in the United States is sometimes called a welcome center.  Welcome centers tend to be larger than regular rest areas, and are staffed at peak travel times with one or more employees who advise travelers as to their options.  Some welcome centers contain a small museum or at least a basic information kiosk about the state.  Because air travel has made it possible to enter and leave many states without crossing the state line at ground level, some states, like California, have official welcome centers inside major cities far from their state borders.  In some states (such as Massachusetts), these rest areas are called tourist information centers and in others (such as New Jersey), visitor centers.

Other types
Rest areas without modern restrooms are called 'waysides'.  These locations have parking spaces for trucks and cars, or for semi-trailer trucks only. Some have portable toilets and waste containers. In Missouri these locations are called 'Roadside Parks' or 'Roadside Tables'.

The most basic parking areas have no facilities of any kind; they consist solely of a paved shoulder on the side of the highway where travelers can rest for a short time.  A scenic area is similar to a parking area, but it is provided to the traveler in a place of natural beauty.  These are also called scenic overlooks.

Oceania

Australia

Rest areas in Australia are a common feature of the road network in rural areas. They are the responsibility of a variety of authorities, such as a state transport or main roads bureau, or a local government's works department. Facilities and standards vary widely and unpredictably: a well-appointed rest area will have bins to deposit small items of litter, a picnic table with seating, a cold water tap (sometimes fed by a rainwater tank), barbecue fireplace (sometimes gas or electric), toilets, and – less commonly – showers. Other rest areas, especially in more remote locations, may lack some or even all of these facilities: in South Australia, a rest area may be no more than a cleared section besides the road with a sign indicating its purpose. Rest areas in Australia do not provide service stations or restaurants (such facilities would be called roadhouses or truck stops), although there may be caravans, often run by charities, providing refreshments to travellers.

Comfort and hygiene are important considerations for the responsible authorities, as such remote sites can be very expensive to clean and maintain, and vandalism is common. Also, Australia's dependence on road transport by heavy vehicles can lead to competition between the amenity needs of recreational travelers and those of the drivers of heavy vehicles—so much so that on arterial routes it is common to see rest areas specifically signed to segregate the two user groups entirely. Thus rest areas generally do not allow overnight occupation. In Queensland, however, well-maintained rest areas sometimes explicitly invite travelers to stay overnight, as a road safety measure, but this is rare elsewhere.

See also 
 Aid station
 Caravanserai
 Diner

References

External links and further reading

Examples of rest area locations 
 
  (Map of US rest areas)
 
 

 
Road infrastructure
Safety